Ashraf Omar Amaya (born November 23, 1971) is an American former professional basketball player.

High school career
Amaya attended Oak Park and River Forest High School for his freshman year, but he transferred to Walther Lutheran High School to finish his high school career.  While at Walther, Amaya led the Broncos to a 3rd-place finish in the 1988 Illinois High School Association playoffs.  Amaya's number 50 jersey is retired at Walther.

College career
Amaya played college basketball for the Southern Illinois University.

Professional career
After college, Amaya then would appear for the Vancouver Grizzlies in their inaugural season (1995–96) and Washington Bullets (1996–97) in the NBA, playing a total of 85 games in those two seasons.

Amaya last played professionally for the Apollon Patras club in Greece, in the Greek Basket League in 2004. He also played for the Dakota Wizards of the NBDL, Alpella Istanbul in Turkey (Turkish League), the Idaho Stampede in the CBA, and Maroussi Athens in Greece, with whom he won the Saporta Cup in 2001.

National team career
Amaya also played for the US national team at the 1998 FIBA World Championship, winning the bronze medal.

References

External links 
nba.com historical playerfile

1971 births
Living people
American expatriate basketball people in Canada
American expatriate basketball people in Greece
American expatriate basketball people in Italy
American expatriate basketball people in Spain
American expatriate basketball people in Turkey
Ampelokipoi B.C. players
Apollon Patras B.C. players
Basketball players from Illinois
Dakota Wizards (CBA) players
Fort Wayne Fury players
Forwards (basketball)
Idaho Stampede (CBA) players
Liga ACB players
Maroussi B.C. players
Mens Sana Basket players
Sportspeople from Oak Park, Illinois
Quad City Thunder players
Southern Illinois Salukis men's basketball players
Sportspeople from the Chicago metropolitan area
Undrafted National Basketball Association players
United States men's national basketball team players
American men's basketball players
Vancouver Grizzlies players
Washington Bullets players
1998 FIBA World Championship players
Tenerife CB players